Elisha Whittlesey (October 19, 1783 – January 7, 1863) was a lawyer, civil servant and U.S. Representative from Ohio.

Biography
Born in Washington, Connecticut, Whittlesey moved with his parents in early youth to Salisbury, Connecticut. He attended the common schools at Danbury, and studied law there.
He was admitted to the bar of Fairfield County and practiced in Danbury and Fairfield County. He also practiced in New Milford, Connecticut, in 1805.
He moved to Canfield, Ohio, in 1806, where he practiced law and taught school.
He served as prosecuting attorney of Mahoning County.
He served as military and private secretary to Gen. William Henry Harrison and as brigade major in the Army of the Northwest in the War of 1812. He served as member of the Ohio House of Representatives in 1820 and 1821.

Whittlesey was elected to the Eighteenth through Twenty-second Congresses, elected as an Anti-Masonic candidate to the Twenty-third Congress, and elected as a Whig to the Twenty-fourth and Twenty-fifth Congresses and served from March 4, 1823, to July 9, 1838, when he resigned. He was one of the founders of the Whig Party.
He served as chairman of the Committee on Claims (Twenty-first through Twenty-fifth Congresses).
He was Sixth Auditor of the Treasury from March 18, 1841, until December 18, 1843, when he resigned and resumed the practice of law in Canfield.
He was appointed general agent of the Washington Monument Association in 1847.
He was appointed by President Zachary Taylor as First Comptroller of the Treasury and served from May 31, 1849, to March 26, 1857, when he was removed by President James Buchanan.
He was reappointed by President Abraham Lincoln April 10, 1861, and served until his death in Washington, D.C., January 7, 1863. He was interred in the Canfield Village Cemetery, Canfield, Ohio.

Family
He was an uncle of William Augustus Whittlesey and Charles Whittlesey, and a cousin of Frederick Whittlesey and Thomas Tucker Whittlesey.

Notes

References
 Retrieved on 2009-5-18

1783 births
1863 deaths
People from Washington, Connecticut
Ohio Democratic-Republicans
Democratic-Republican Party members of the United States House of Representatives
Ohio National Republicans
National Republican Party members of the United States House of Representatives
Anti-Masonic Party politicians from Ohio
Anti-Masonic Party members of the United States House of Representatives from Ohio
Whig Party members of the United States House of Representatives from Ohio
Members of the Ohio House of Representatives
People from Canfield, Ohio
United States Army personnel of the War of 1812
Comptrollers of the United States Treasury
United States Army officers
19th-century American politicians
19th-century American businesspeople
Litchfield Law School alumni